Marko Bagarić (born 31 December 1985 in Bukovica, Yugoslavia) is a Croatian-born Qatari handball player who plays for TuS Nettelstedt-Lübbecke and the Qatari national team.

He participated at the 2016 Summer Olympics in Rio de Janeiro, in the men's handball tournament.

References

1985 births
Living people
Qatari male handball players
Qatari people of Croatian descent
Croatian male handball players
RK Zamet players
TuS Nettelstedt-Lübbecke players
Olympic handball players of Qatar
Handball players at the 2016 Summer Olympics